IML may refer to:

Computing 
 Interactive matrix language, a part of SAS (software)
 Initial Microprogram Load, reloading Microcode into a Writable Control Store (WCS)
 Integrated Management Log, a server technology of Hewlett-Packard

Other uses 
 In-mould labelling, a plastic production process
 Instituti i Mjekësisë Ligjore, an Albanian institute of forensics
 Intermediolateral nucleus, a part of the spinal cord
 IML Walking Association, promotes non competitive walking events
 International Mr. Leather, a fetish convention
 International Ms. Leather, a fetish convention
 International Monarchist League, a political organisation
 One of various Institutes of Modern Languages
 Information and media literacy, the skill that helps people form and share informed judgements while working with information and media
 Investors Mutual Limited, an Australian asset management limited company